Jax may refer to:

Places
 Jax, Haute-Loire, France
 Informal shorthand for Jacksonville, Florida, United States
 Jacksonville station, Amtrak station
 Jacksonville International Airport
 Naval Air Station Jacksonville

People
 Garth Jax (born 1963), American football player
 Griffin Jax (born 1994), American baseball player
 Jax Anderson (born 199?), American singer
 Jax Dane (born 1981), American professional wrestler
 Jax Jones (born 1987), British musician
 Jax Malcolm (born 2003), American actor
 Jax (singer) (born 1996), American singer and American Idol contestant
 Nia Jax (born 1984), American wrestler
 Jax (drag queen), American drag queen

Brands and companies
 Jackson Laboratory, a biology research center
 Jax Brewing Company, a brewery in Jacksonville, Florida
 Jax Media, a film and television production company
 JAX Tyres, an Australian retailer

Arts and entertainment
 Jax and the Hellhound, a comic book series

Characters
 Jax (Mortal Kombat), a fighting character from the Mortal Kombat game series
 Jackson "Jax" Teller, a character from the TV show Sons of Anarchy
 Jasper Jacks, a character from the TV show General Hospital
 Jax Amnell, a character from Terry Goodkind's novel The Law of Nines
 Jax, a Beast Bot in Power Rangers Beast Morphers
 Jax, a character from Elex
 Jax, a character from the comic strip You Can with Beakman and Jax
 Jax, a character from The Kingkiller Chronicle by Patrick Rothfuss
 "Jaxx", a character played by Ruby Rose in the movie "The Meg"

Sports

Jacksonville, Florida 
 Jacksonville Jaguars, an American professional football franchise
 Jacksonville Jax, a former minor league baseball team
 FC JAX Destroyers, an American former professional soccer team

Elsewhere 
 Portland LumberJax, an American former professional lacrosse team from Portland, Oregon

Other uses
 Google JAX, a machine learning framework for transforming numerical functions
 Jambi Malay, a language spoken in Indonesia
 Java XML, a set of APIs for the Java programming language
 Jax Panik, a South African performing act
 Ornipholidotos jax, a butterfly in the family Lycaenidae

See also
 Jacks (disambiguation)
 Jackson (disambiguation)
 Jaxon (disambiguation)
 Jaxson (disambiguation)
 MathJax, software tool to display mathematical equations in web browsers